Two Can Play is a 1926 American silent drama film directed by Nat Ross and starring George Fawcett, Allan Forrest, and Clara Bow.

Plot
As described in a film magazine review, Dorothy Hammis, a young woman who is in love with James Radley, a high living but worthy young man, learns that her wealthy financier father objects to their engagement and says that he favors another one for whom the woman does not care.  Secretly, the father has hired Robert MacForth, a former pilot, to assist in ending the engagement by discrediting James. To win her from the man he dislikes, the father sends both men and his daughter on an airplane trip but gives instructions to the man he favors to pretend a wreck of the machine. The airplane is really wrecked and the pilot proves to be cowardly. When the father learns what has happened, he alters his opinion of James, the man he previously thought unworthy.

Cast
 George Fawcett as John Hammis
 Allan Forrest as James Radley
 Clara Bow as Dorothy Hammis
 Wallace MacDonald as Robert MacForth
 Vola Vale as Mimi

References

Bibliography
 Munden, Kenneth White. The American Film Institute Catalog of Motion Pictures Produced in the United States, Part 1. University of California Press, 1997.

External links

1926 films
1926 drama films
Silent American drama films
Films directed by Nat Ross
American silent feature films
1920s English-language films
Associated Exhibitors films
American black-and-white films
1920s American films